The Life of Edward II of England, also known as Edward II, is an adaptation by the German modernist playwright Bertolt Brecht of the 16th-century historical tragedy by Marlowe, The Troublesome Reign and Lamentable Death of Edward the Second, King of England, with the Tragical Fall of Proud Mortimer (c.1592). The play is set in England between 1307 and 1326. A prefatory note to the play reads:

Brecht wrote his adaptation in collaboration with Lion Feuchtwanger. It is written mostly in irregular free verse, with two songs (one of which is from Marlowe's original), over twenty-one scenes. Looking back at the play-text near the end of his life, Brecht offered the following assessment of their intentions: "We wanted to make possible a production which would break with the Shakespearean tradition common to German theatres: that lumpy monumental style beloved of middle-class philistines."

Influence on the development of epic theatre
The production of Edward II generated a moment in rehearsal that has become one of the emblematic anecdotes in the history of theatre, which marks a genuine event; a new organizing force had suddenly arrived on the theatrical scene and the shape of 20th-century theatre would come to be determined by the passage of the 'epic' through the dramatic, theatrical and performative fields. Walter Benjamin records Brecht's recollection in 1938 of the pivotal incident:

In this simple idea of applying chalk to the faces of Brecht's actors to indicate the "truth" of the situation of soldiers in battle, Brecht located the germ of his conception of 'epic theatre'. As Tony Meech suggests, the material that Brecht was re-working to a certain extent lent itself to this treatment, but it was the combination of several factors that enabled this production to become so significant:

Production history

Munich, 1924

The play opened at the Munich Kammerspiele on March 19, 1924, in a production that constituted Brecht's solo directorial début. Caspar Neher designed the sets, as he had for the production of Brecht's In the Jungle the year before. Oskar Homolka played Mortimer and Erwin Faber played Edward, with Maria Koppenhöfer and Hans Schweikart also in the cast. According to Faber, Brecht's entire production, from the script to the staging of the scenes, was "balladesque".

New York City, 1982
The Riverside Shakespeare Company staged the play's Off Broadway premiere at the newly renovated The Shakespeare Center on West 86th and Amsterdam, New York City. The production opened on April 23, 1982. W. Stuart McDowell directed, with assistance from Jeannie H. Woods. It featured Dan Southern as Gaveston and Tim Oman as Edward. The cast also included Andrew Achsen, Larry Attille, Christopher Cull, Michael Franks, Margo Gruber, Dan Johnson, Will Lampe, Joe Meek, Jason Moehring, Gay Reed, Count Stovall, Patrick Sullivan, and Jeffery V. Thompson. Dorian Vernacchio designed the set and lighting, David Robinson was the costume designer, and Valerie Kuehn was responsible for the props. Michael Canick composed an original musical score for percussion, which was played by Noel Counsil. Bertha Case (the literary representative for the Brecht estate in the United States) and Stefan Brecht (Bertolt Brecht's son) authorized the production in August 1981, to take place the following year. Joseph Papp and the New York Shakespeare Festival sponsored the production, with additional support from the Goethe House and Marta Feuchtwanger (widow of Lion Feuchtwanger, the play's co-author).  As part of the director's dramaturgical preparation, McDowell travelled to Germany to interview Erwin Faber and Hans Schweikart, two of the actors in Brecht's original production of 1924.

Notes

Works cited

 Brecht, Bertolt. 1924. The Life of Edward II of England. Trans. Jean Benedetti. In Collected Plays: One. Ed. John Willett and Ralph Manheim. Bertolt Brecht: Plays, Poetry and Prose Ser. London: Methuen, 1970. 179–268. . Trans. of Leben Eduards des Zweiten von England. Potdsam: Gustav Kiepenheuer Verlag.
 ---. 1964. Brecht on Theatre: The Development of an Aesthetic. Ed. and trans. John Willett. British edition. London: Methuen. . USA edition. New York: Hill and Wang. .
 McDowell, W. Stuart. 1999. "Actors on Brecht: The Early Years." In Brecht Sourcebook. Ed. Carol Martin and Henry Bial. Worlds of Performance ser. London and New York: Routledge. 71–83. .
 Meech, Tony. 1994. "Brecht's Early Plays." In Thomson and Sacks (1994, 43–55).
 Sacks, Glendyr. 1994. "A Brecht Calendar." In Thomson and Sacks (1994, xvii-xxvii).
 Thomson, Peter and Glendyr Sacks, eds. 1994. The Cambridge Companion to Brecht. Cambridge Companions to Literature Ser. Cambridge: Cambridge University Press. .
 Willett, John. 1967. The Theatre of Bertolt Brecht: A Study from Eight Aspects. Third rev. ed. London: Methuen, 1977. .
 Willett, John and Ralph Manheim. 1970. Collected Plays: One by Bertolt Brecht. Ed. John Willett and Ralph Manheim. Bertolt Brecht: Plays, Poetry and Prose Ser. London: Methuen. .

Plays by Bertolt Brecht
1924 plays
Plays about English royalty
Cultural depictions of Edward II of England
Adaptations of works by Christopher Marlowe
Plays based on other plays